Kathryn Dee Robinson (born 1950) was the American Ambassador to Ghana from 1998 until 2001. She served as Consul General at the U.S. Embassy in Beijing beginning in 1988 and in Seoul since 1995.

Robinson earned a B.A. with honors from the University of Tennessee in Knoxville in 1972.

References

1950 births
Living people
American women ambassadors
Ambassadors of the United States to Ghana
American consuls
University of Tennessee alumni